Aubrey Wilbert Begg (9 April 1929 – 7 November 1988) was a New Zealand Member of Parliament, for Awarua in Southland.

Biography

Early life and career
Begg was born in Balclutha, educated at Southland Boys' High School, and was a farmer near Invercargill. In 1954 he married Joy Rose Wright with whom he had three sons and one daughter. Through his involvement in farming, Begg became an executive member of Federated Farmers and later was its junior vice-president of the meat and wool section.

He was described as a "true son of Southland" who never gave up his independence. Parliamentary colleague Colin Moyle stated Begg paid a price for his individualism and his lack of teamwork cost him the advancement that he could have had.

Political career

Despite losing he was well remembered in the electorate, particularly for winning a majority at the pooling booth in Drummond which was normally a National Party stronghold. However Begg in turn defeated Templeton by 700 votes at the  election as part of Labour's landslide victory. He held the seat for one term until he was defeated in 1975. He quickly earned a reputation for speaking forthrightly on farming issues particularly in favour of meat producers. Notably he was a strong opponent of a scheme to acquire compulsorily the wool clip despite the scheme being supported by the Third Labour Government.

Following his defeat he stood for the vice-presidency of the Labour Party at the 1976 party conference. He lost to Gerald O'Brien, placing third in the delegate ballot with 135 votes compared to O'Brien's 585 votes and 344 for Dorothy Jelicich. Begg became a member of Labour's party executive and chairman of Labour's Agricultural Advisory Committee.

Later life and death
After exiting parliament Begg became President of the Southland branch of Federated Farmers.

In August 1988 was taken ill and underwent exploratory surgery for what was found to be cancer. He died on 7 November 1988 in Invercargill, aged 59.

References

1929 births
1988 deaths
People educated at Southland Boys' High School
New Zealand farmers
New Zealand Labour Party MPs
People from Balclutha, New Zealand
Members of the New Zealand House of Representatives
New Zealand MPs for South Island electorates
Unsuccessful candidates in the 1978 New Zealand general election
Unsuccessful candidates in the 1981 New Zealand general election
Unsuccessful candidates in the 1975 New Zealand general election
Unsuccessful candidates in the 1969 New Zealand general election
Unsuccessful candidates in the 1966 New Zealand general election
Deaths from cancer in New Zealand